Mark Allan Goldsmith (born August 1952) is a United States district judge of the United States District Court for the Eastern District of Michigan.

Early life and education 

Born in Detroit, Goldsmith was a member of the first graduating class of Hillel Day School.
He earned a Bachelor of Arts degree in 1974 from the University of Michigan and a Juris Doctor in 1977 from Harvard Law School.

Professional career 

From 1979 until 1980, Goldsmith served as a litigation associate for the law firm Paul, Weiss, Rifkind, Wharton & Garrison in New York City. From 1980 until 1987, Goldsmith served as a sole legal practitioner in Birmingham, Michigan. From 1987 until 1988, he served as an associate for the Detroit law firm Honigman Miller Schwartz and Cohn, and then from 1988 until 2004, Goldsmith served as a partner for the same firm. In 2004, Goldsmith became a circuit court judge in Oakland County, Michigan.

Federal judicial service 

In March 2009, Goldsmith submitted an application to Michigan's judicial advisory committee, which was established by Michigan Senators Carl Levin and Debbie Stabenow. He was interviewed by the committee in May 2009. In June 2009, the committee informed Goldsmith that it intended to recommend his nomination to President Obama for nomination to the federal district court. On February 4, 2010, Obama officially nominated Goldsmith for the seat, which would fill the vacancy created by the decision by Judge John Corbett O'Meara to take senior status. On March 18, 2010, the United States Senate Committee on the Judiciary reported Goldsmith's nomination to the full Senate. The Senate confirmed Goldsmith on June 21, 2010 in an 89–0 vote. He received his commission on June 22, 2010.

See also 
 List of Jewish American jurists

References

External links

1952 births
Harvard Law School alumni
Judges of the United States District Court for the Eastern District of Michigan
Living people
Michigan state court judges
Lawyers from Detroit
United States district court judges appointed by Barack Obama
21st-century American judges
University of Michigan alumni
Paul, Weiss, Rifkind, Wharton & Garrison people